Alberto Giacometti (10 October 1901 – 11 January 1966) was a Swiss sculptor, painter, draftsman and printmaker.  Beginning in 1922, he lived and worked mainly in Paris but regularly visited his hometown Borgonovo to see his family and work on his art.

Giacometti was one of the most important sculptors of the 20th century. His work was particularly influenced by artistic styles such as Cubism and Surrealism. Philosophical questions about the human condition, as well as existential and phenomenological debates played a significant role in his work. Around 1935 he gave up on his Surrealist influences to pursue a more deepened analysis of figurative compositions. Giacometti wrote texts for periodicals and exhibition catalogues and recorded his thoughts and memories in notebooks and diaries. His critical nature led to self-doubt about his own work and his self-perceived inability to do justice to his own artistic vision. His insecurities nevertheless remained a powerful motivating artistic force throughout his entire life.

Between 1938 and 1944 Giacometti's sculptures had a maximum height of seven centimeters (2.75 inches). Their small size reflected the actual distance between the artist's position and his model. In this context he self-critically stated: "But wanting to create from memory what I had seen, to my terror the sculptures became smaller and smaller". After World War II, Giacometti created his most famous sculptures: his extremely tall and slender figurines. These sculptures were subject to his individual viewing experience—between an imaginary yet real, a tangible yet inaccessible space.

In Giacometti's whole body of work, his painting constitutes only a small part. After 1957, however, his figurative paintings were equally as present as his sculptures. The almost monochrome paintings of his late work do not refer to any other artistic styles of modernity.

Early life 

Giacometti was born in Borgonovo, Switzerland, the eldest of four children of Giovanni Giacometti, a well-known post-Impressionist painter, and Annetta Giacometti-Stampa. He was a descendant of Protestant refugees escaping the inquisition. Coming from an artistic background, he was interested in art from an early age and was encouraged by his father and godfather. Alberto attended the Geneva School of Fine Arts. His brothers Diego (1902–1985) and Bruno (1907–2012) would go on to become artists and architects as well. Additionally, his cousin Zaccaria Giacometti, later professor of constitutional law and chancellor of the University of Zurich, grew up together with them, having been orphaned at the age of 12 in 1905.

Career 
In 1922, he moved to Paris to study under the sculptor Antoine Bourdelle, an associate of Rodin. It was there that Giacometti experimented with Cubism and Surrealism and came to be regarded as one of the leading Surrealist sculptors. Among his associates were Miró, Max Ernst, Picasso, Bror Hjorth, and Balthus.

Between 1936 and 1940, Giacometti concentrated his sculpting on the human head, focusing on the sitter's gaze. He preferred models he was close to—his sister and the artist Isabel Rawsthorne (then known as Isabel Delmer). This was followed by a phase in which his statues of Isabel became stretched out; her limbs elongated. Obsessed with creating his sculptures exactly as he envisioned through his unique view of reality, he often carved until they were as thin as nails and reduced to the size of a pack of cigarettes, much to his consternation. A friend of his once said that if Giacometti decided to sculpt you, "he would make your head look like the blade of a knife".
 
During World War II, Giacometti took refuge in Switzerland. There, in 1946, he met Annette Arm, a secretary for the Red Cross. They married in 1949.

After his marriage his tiny sculptures became larger, but the larger they grew, the thinner they became. For the remainder of Giacometti's life, Annette was his main female model. His paintings underwent a parallel procedure. The figures appear isolated and severely attenuated, as the result of continuous reworking.

He frequently revisited his subjects: one of his favourite models was his younger brother Diego.

Later years 

In 1958 Giacometti was asked to create a monumental sculpture for the Chase Manhattan Bank building in New York, which was beginning construction. Although he had for many years "harbored an ambition to create work for a public square", he "had never set foot in New York, and knew nothing about life in a rapidly evolving metropolis. Nor had he ever laid eyes on an actual skyscraper", according to his biographer James Lord. Giacometti's work on the project resulted in the four figures of standing women—his largest sculptures—entitled Grande femme debout I through IV (1960). The commission was never completed, however, because Giacometti was unsatisfied by the relationship between the sculpture and the site, and abandoned the project.

In 1962, Giacometti was awarded the grand prize for sculpture at the Venice Biennale, and the award brought with it worldwide fame. Even when he had achieved popularity and his work was in demand, he still reworked models, often destroying them or setting them aside to be returned to years later. The prints produced by Giacometti are often overlooked but the catalogue raisonné, Giacometti – The Complete Graphics and 15 Drawings by Herbert Lust (Tudor 1970), comments on their impact and gives details of the number of copies of each print. Some of his most important images were in editions of only 30 and many were described as rare in 1970.

In his later years Giacometti's works were shown in a number of large exhibitions throughout Europe. Riding a wave of international popularity, and despite his declining health, he traveled to the United States in 1965 for an exhibition of his works at the Museum of Modern Art in New York. As his last work he prepared the text for the book Paris sans fin, a sequence of 150 lithographs containing memories of all the places where he had lived.

Death 

Giacometti died in 1966 of heart disease (pericarditis) and Chronic Obstructive Pulmonary Disease at the Kantonsspital in Chur, Switzerland. His body was returned to his birthplace in Borgonovo, where he was interred close to his parents.

With no children, Annette Giacometti became the sole holder of his property rights. She worked to collect a full listing of authenticated works by her late husband, gathering documentation on the location and manufacture of his works and working to fight the rising number of counterfeited works. When she died in 1993, the Fondation Giacometti was set up by the French state.

In May 2007 the executor of his widow's estate, former French foreign minister Roland Dumas, was convicted of illegally selling Giacometti's works to a top auctioneer, Jacques Tajan, who was also convicted. Both were ordered to pay €850,000 to the Alberto and Annette Giacometti Foundation.

Artistic analysis 

Regarding Giacometti's sculptural technique and according to the Metropolitan Museum of Art: "The rough, eroded, heavily worked surfaces of Three Men Walking (II), 1949, typify his technique. Reduced, as they are, to their very core, these figures evoke lone trees in winter that have lost their foliage. Within this style, Giacometti would rarely deviate from the three themes that preoccupied him—the walking man; the standing, nude woman; and the bust—or all three, combined in various groupings."

In a letter to Pierre Matisse, Giacometti wrote: "Figures were never a compact mass but like a transparent construction".  In the letter, Giacometti writes about how he looked back at the realist, classical busts of his youth with nostalgia, and tells the story of the existential crisis which precipitated the style he became known for.

"[I rediscovered] the wish to make compositions with figures. For this I had to make (quickly I thought; in passing), one or two studies from nature, just enough to understand the construction of a head, of a whole figure, and in 1935 I took a model. This study should take, I thought, two weeks and then I could realize my compositions...I worked with the model all day from 1935 to 1940...Nothing was as I imagined.  A head, became for me an object completely unknown and without dimensions."

Since Giacometti achieved exquisite realism with facility when he was executing busts in his early adolescence, Giacometti's difficulty in re-approaching the figure as an adult is generally understood as a sign of existential struggle for meaning, rather than as a technical deficit.

Giacometti was a key player in the Surrealist art movement, but his work resists easy categorization. Some describe it as formalist, others argue it is expressionist or otherwise having to do with what Deleuze calls "blocs of sensation" (as in Deleuze's analysis of Francis Bacon). Even after his excommunication from the Surrealist group, while the intention of his sculpting was usually imitation, the end products were an expression of his emotional response to the subject. He attempted to create renditions of his models the way he saw them, and the way he thought they ought to be seen. He once said that he was sculpting not the human figure but "the shadow that is cast".

Scholar William Barrett in Irrational Man: A Study in Existential Philosophy (1962), argues that the attenuated forms of Giacometti's figures reflect the view of 20th century modernism and existentialism that modern life is increasingly empty and devoid of meaning. "All the sculptures of today, like those of the past, will end one day in pieces...So it is important to fashion one's work carefully in its smallest recess and charge every particle of matter with life."

A 2011–2012 exhibition at the Pinacothèque de Paris focused on showing how Giacometti was inspired by Etruscan art.

Walking Man and other human figures 
Giacometti is best known for the bronze sculptures of tall, thin human figures, made in the years 1945 to 1960. Giacometti was influenced by the impressions he took from the people hurrying in the big city. People in motion he saw as "a succession of moments of stillness".

The emaciated figures are often interpreted as an expression of the existential fear, insignificance and loneliness of mankind. The mood of fear in the period of the 1940s and the Cold War is reflected in this figure. It feels sad, lonely and difficult to relate to.

Legacy

Exhibitions 
Giacometti's work has been the subject of numerous solo exhibitions including the High Museum of Art, Atlanta (1970); Centre Pompidou, Paris (2007–2008); Pushkin Museum, Moscow "The Studio of Alberto Giacometti: Collection of the Fondation Alberto et Annette Giacometti" (2008); Kunsthal Rotterdam (2008); Fondation Beyeler, Basel (2009);  Buenos Aires (2012); Kunsthalle Hamburg (2013); Pera Museum, Istanbul (2015); Tate Modern, London (2017); Vancouver Art Gallery, "Alberto Giacometti: A Line Through Time" (2019); National Gallery of Ireland, Dublin (2022).

The National Portrait Gallery, London's first solo exhibition of Giacometti's work, Pure Presence opened to five star reviews on 13 October 2015 (to 10 January 2016, in honour of the fiftieth anniversary of the artist's death).
From April 2019, the Prado Museum in Madrid, has been highlighting Giacometti in an exhibition.

Public collections 
Giacometti's work is displayed in numerous public collections, including:

 Albright-Knox Art Gallery, Buffalo
 Art Institute of Chicago
 Baltimore Museum of Art, Baltimore, Maryland
 Bechtler Museum of Modern Art, Charlotte, North Carolina
 Berggruen Museum, Berlin
 Botero Museum, Bogotá, Colombia
 Bündner Kunstmuseum Chur, Switzerland
 Carnegie Museum of Art, Pittsburgh
 Detroit Institute of Arts
 Fondation Beyeler, Basel
 Hirshhorn Museum and Sculpture Garden, Washington D.C.
 J. Paul Getty Museum, Los Angeles, California
 Johnson Museum of Art, Cornell University
 Kunsthaus Zürich
 Kunstmuseum Basel
 Leeum, Samsung Museum of Art, South Korea
 Los Angeles County Museum of Art
 Louisiana Museum of Modern Art, Denmark
 Minneapolis Institute of Art
 Museum of Modern Art, New York
 Museum of Fine Arts, Boston
 National Gallery of Art, Washington D.C.
 National Gallery of Canada, Ottawa
 North Carolina Museum of Art, Raleigh, North Carolina
 Sainsbury Centre for Visual Arts, University of East Anglia
 Scottsdale Museum of Contemporary Art, Scottsdale, Arizona
 Solomon R. Guggenheim Museum, New York
 Tate, London
 Tehran Museum of Contemporary Art, Iran
 University of Michigan Museum of Art
 Wadsworth Atheneum, Hartford
 Walker Art Center, Minneapolis
Vancouver Art Gallery

Art foundations 
The Fondation Alberto et Annette Giacometti, having received a bequest from Alberto Giacometti's widow Annette, holds a collection of circa 5,000 works, frequently displayed around the world through exhibitions and long-term loans. A public interest institution, the Foundation was created in 2003 and aims at promoting, disseminating, preserving and protecting Alberto Giacometti's work.

The Alberto-Giacometti-Stiftung established in Zürich in 1965, holds a smaller collection of works acquired from the collection of the Pittsburgh industrialist G. David Thompson.

Notable sales 
According to record Giacometti has sold the two most expensive sculptures in history.

In November 2000 a Giacometti bronze, Grande Femme Debout I, sold for $14.3 million. Grande Femme Debout II was bought by the Gagosian Gallery for $27.4 million at Christie's auction in New York City on 6 May 2008.

L'Homme qui marche I, a life-sized bronze sculpture of a man, became one of the most expensive works of art, and at the time was the most expensive sculpture ever sold at auction. It was in February 2010, when it sold for £65 million (US$104.3 million) at Sotheby's, London. Grande tête mince, a large bronze bust, sold for $53.3 million just three months later.

L'Homme au doigt (Pointing Man) sold for $126 million (£81,314,455.32), or $141.3 million with fees, in Christie's May 2015, "Looking Forward to the Past" sale in New York City. The work had been in the same private collection for 45 years. As of now it is the most expensive sculpture sold at auction.

After being showcased on the BBC programme Fake or Fortune, a plaster sculpture, titled Gazing Head, sold in 2019 for half a million pounds.

In April 2021, Giacometti's small-scale bronze sculpture, Nu debout II (1953), was sold from a Japanese private collection and went for £1.5 million ($2 million), against an estimate of £800,000 ($1.1 million).

Other legacy 
Giacometti created the monument on the grave of Gerda Taro at Père Lachaise Cemetery.

In 2001 he was included in the Painting the Century: 101 Portrait Masterpieces 1900–2000 exhibition held at the National Portrait Gallery, London.

Giacometti and his sculpture L'Homme qui marche I appear on the former 100 Swiss franc banknote.

According to a lecture by Michael Peppiatt at Cambridge University on 8 July 2010, Giacometti, who had a friendship with author/playwright Samuel Beckett, created a tree for the set of a 1961 Paris production of Waiting for Godot.

The 2017 movie Final Portrait retells the story of his friendship with the biographer James Lord. Giacometti is played by Geoffrey Rush.

References

Citations

General sources 
 Jacques Dupin (1962). Alberto Giacometti, Paris, Maeght
 Reinhold Hohl (1971). Alberto Giacometti, Stuttgart: Gerd Hatje
 Die Sammlung der Alberto Giacometti-Stiftung (1990), Zürich, Zürcher Kunstgesellschaft
 Alberto Giacometti (1991–92). Sculptures – peintures – dessins. Paris, Musée d'art moderne de la Ville de Paris,.
 Jean Soldini (1993). Alberto Giacometti. Le colossal, la mère, le sacré, Lausanne, L'Age d'Homme
 David Sylvester (1996) Looking at Giacometti, Henry Holt & Co.
 Alberto Giacometti 1901–1966. Kunsthalle Wien, 1996
 James Lord (1997). Giacometti: A Biography, Farrar, Straus and Giroux
 Alberto Giacometti. Kunsthaus Zürich, 2001. New York: The Museum of Modern Art, 2001–2002.
 Yves Bonnefoy (2006). Alberto Giacometti: A Biography of His Work, New edition, Flammarion
 
 

 Further reading 
 Alberto Giacometti. L'espace et la force, Jean Soldini, Kimé (2016).
 Alberto Giacometti, Yves Bonnefoy, Assouline Publishing (22 February 2011)
 In Giacometti's Studio, Michael Peppiatt, Yale University Press (14 December 2010)
 Alberto Giacometti: A Biography of His Work, Yves Bonnefoy, New edition, Flammarion (2006)
 Giacometti: A Biography, James Lord, Farrar, Straus and Giroux (1997)
 Looking at Giacometti, David Sylvester, Henry Holt & Co. (1996)
 Alberto Giacometti, Herbert Matter &  Mercedes Matter, Harry N Abrams (September 1987)
 A Giacometti Portrait, James Lord, Farrar, Straus and Giroux (1 July 1980)
 Alberto Giacometti, Reinhold Hohl, H. N. Abrams (1972)
 Alberto Giacometti, Reinhold Hohl, Stuttgart: Gerd Hatje (1971)
 Alberto Giacometti, Jacques Dupin,  Paris, Maeght (1962)
 The Studio of Alberto Giacometti: Collection of the Fondation Alberto et Annette Giacometti, Véronique Wiesinger (ed.), exh. cat., Paris: Fondation Alberto et Annette Giacometti/Centre Pompidou (2007) 
 "The Dream, the Sphinx, and the Death of T", Alberto Giacometti, X magazine, Vol. 1, No. 1 (November 1959); An Anthology from X (Oxford University Press 1988).
 Jacobi, Carol. Out of the Cage: The Art of Isabel Rawsthorne'', London: The Estate of Francis Bacon Publishing, Feb 2021 
 
 The Cube and the Face: Around a Sculpture by Alberto Giacometti, Didi-Huberman, Georges (2015).

External links 

 The Alberto et Annette Giacometti Foundation website
 
 
 Works of Alberto Giacometti:
 The UNESCO Works of Art Collection
 
 smARThistory: Giacometti's City Square
 Life of Alberto Giacometti:
 Chronology of his life with illustrations from the Museum of Modern Art
 Exhibition at Kunsthaus Zürich from 27 February until 24 May 2009
 Alberto Giacometti in the National Gallery of Australia's Kenneth Tyler Collection
 

 
1901 births
1966 deaths
20th-century Swiss male artists
20th-century Swiss sculptors
Modern sculptors
People from Maloja District
Sibling artists
Surrealist artists
Swiss Protestants
Swiss surrealist artists
Swiss-Italian people